Marcus Henry Kellogg (March 31, 1831 – June 25, 1876) was a newspaper reporter killed at the Battle of the Little Bighorn. Kellogg rode with George Armstrong Custer during the battle. His dispatches were the only press coverage of Custer and his men in the days leading up to the battle. As a newspaper stringer whose reports were picked up around the country, Kellogg is considered the first Associated Press correspondent to die in the line of duty.

Life
Born on March 31, 1831, in Brighton, Ontario, Canada, Kellogg was the third of ten children. Kellogg's family moved a number of times in his youth before they eventually settled in La Crosse, Wisconsin. While there Kellogg learned to operate a telegraph and went to work for both the Northwestern Telegraph Company and the Atlantic and Pacific Telegraph Company.

He married Martha J. Robinson in 1861 and they had two daughters. During the years of the American Civil War, Kellogg became the assistant editor for the La Crosse Democrat newspaper. He also unsuccessfully ran for the office of city clerk in 1867 and played shortstop on one of the town's baseball teams.

In 1867 Kellogg's wife died. Leaving his daughters to be raised by an aunt, Kellogg began drifting around the upper Midwest, working as a reporter and editorial assistant in places such as Council Bluffs, Iowa, and Brainerd, Minnesota. While living in Brainerd he ran for election to the Minnesota Legislature, but was defeated.  He also worked as a string correspondent for the St. Paul Dispatch, with his articles often published under the pen name of "Frontier.".

In the early 1870s, he moved to Bismarck, North Dakota, where in 1873 he helped editor Clement A. Lounsberry found The Bismarck Tribune. Even though Kellogg was only an editorial assistant for the paper, he substituted for Lounsberry as editor of the Tribune second, third and fourth issues.

Battle of the Little Bighorn
When Lounsberry learned that a military column (including the 7th U.S. Cavalry Regiment commanded by Lt. Col. George Armstrong Custer) would soon leave Fort Abraham Lincoln for the Montana Territory, he agreed to accompany Custer and provide news coverage. However, at the last minute Lounsberry's wife fell ill, so the editor asked Kellogg to take his place. Lounsberry expected Kellogg would cover nothing more than a sensational military victory.

Kellogg sent three dispatches back to Lounsberry, the last one four days before the battle when they were near the mouth of the Rosebud River. His last dispatch read, "By the time this reaches you we would have met and fought the red devils, with what result remains to be seen. I go with Custer and will be at the death." Kellogg was not predicting his own death or Custer's defeat; instead, "at the death" is a phrase borrowed from fox hunting meaning "present at the kill" (viz., of the pursued).

Four days after that dispatch, the Battle of the Little Bighorn was fought, resulting in the deaths of Custer and the 208 soldiers, scouts, and civilians riding with him, including Kellogg.

Aftermath
Colonel John Gibbon, whose men arrived at the battle on Tuesday, June 27, and also helped bury the dead, said he found Kellogg's body in a ravine where a number of men from Company E died. Kellogg's body was scalped and missing an ear; he was identified by the boots he wore.

When Clement Lounsberry learned of the defeat of Custer's force and Kellogg's death, he "worked tirelessly throughout the night" to produce a special edition of The Bismarck Tribune. Published on July 6, 1876, the article was the battle's first full account. Lounsberry also telegraphed the news, including Kellogg's correspondence, to a number of eastern newspapers, including the New York Herald. Two letters written by Kellogg were published posthumously by the Herald on July 11, 1876.

As a newspaper stringer whose reports were picked up around the country, Kellogg is considered the first Associated Press correspondent to die in the line of duty.

Some of Kellogg's diary and notes survived the battle and these, along with his news accounts, are one of the primary historical sources for information on the days preceding the battle. His notes are now in the possession of the State Historical Society of North Dakota. His satchel, pencil, and eyeglasses are on display in the Newseum in Washington, DC.

See also
 American Indian Wars
 Crazy Horse
 List of journalists killed in the United States
 Sitting Bull

Notes

Further reading
 Barnard, Sandy. I Go With Custer: The Life & Death of Reporter Mark Kellogg. Bismarck, ND: Bismarck Tribune Publishing Co., 1996. Includes a reprint of Kellogg's diary.
 Hixon, John C. "Custer's 'Mysterious Mr. Kellogg' and the Diary of Mark Kellogg". North Dakota History, vol. 17, no. 3 (1950).
 Kellogg, Mark. "Notes on the Little Big Horn Expedition Under General Custer, 1876" in Contributions to the Historical Society of Montana, vol. 9. Helena, Mont.: Rocky Mountain Pub. Co., 1923.
 Knight, Oliver. "Mark Kellogg Telegraphed for Custer’s Rescue". North Dakota Historical Society Quarterly, vol. 27, no. 2 (Spring 1960).
 Saum, Lewis O. "Colonel Custer's Copperhead: The Mysterious Mark Kellogg". Montana: The Magazine of Western History, vol. 28, no. 4 (Autumn 1978).
 Watson, Elmo Scott. "The 'Custer Campaign Diary' of Mark Kellogg" in The Westerners Brand Book 1945–46. Chicago: The Westerners, 1947.

Journalists killed while covering military conflicts
American people of the Indian Wars
People from Bismarck, North Dakota
People from Northumberland County, Ontario
Writers from La Crosse, Wisconsin
1831 births
1876 deaths
Associated Press reporters
Journalists killed in the United States
19th-century American journalists
American male journalists
Journalists from North Dakota
Battle of the Little Bighorn
19th-century male writers